Musang Berjanggut ("Bearded Civet") is 1959 Malaysian period romantic comedy film directed by and starring P. Ramlee. The story is in the style of a traditional Malay folktale, featuring supernatural elements and a story with an underlying moral. The plot follows the adventures of a prince named Tun Nila who sets out to find a woman who will marry him, and what happens when he finds her at last.

Plot
Tun Nila Utama, the adopted prince in the kingdom of Pura Cendana, is told by the king that it is time for him to choose a bride. However, Tun Nila refuses to marry any of the women in the kingdom, claiming that they not true "females" because they have no honour. The King is angered by his claim and orders him to find a true woman, if such a person exists. Tun Nila accepts the command and swears that he will not return to Pura Chendana or shave any hair on his face until he finds her.

Tun Nila sets up the test he will use to find a true woman. The test consists of a bag which contains a mix of rice, salt, chilli, onions, garlic and spices. A real woman would be able to cook the items in the bag, and he will marry the woman who does.

Tun Nila travels the across country, seeking shelter in any house that will welcome him. If there is a woman of marrying age in the house, he would ask her to cook the items in the bag. All the young women, upon seeing the mixed contents of the bag, decide that the task is impossible or that Tun Nila is insane, and all return the bag and its contents to him untouched. Tun Nila eventually grows a thick beard as woman after woman is unable to cook the items in his bag.

Tun Nila eventually meets Puspawangi and asks to meet her parents. As Tun Nila follows her, he discovers Puspawangi's unusual intelligence. When they reach the house, Puspawangi's father welcomes Tun Nila to their home. As with all the previous homes he has visited, Tun Nila gives them the bag and requests that they cook the items in it.

In the kitchen Puspawangi and her mother look into the bag, and though Puspawangi's mother quickly says that Tun Nila's request is impossible, Puspawangi stops her and says that this isn't the request of a mad man, but of an intelligent man. She pours the items into a large tray and carefully sifts through the mix. Eventually she separates all the items into individual piles and is able to cook it.

That night Puspawangi presents the food to the whole family to eat. Puspawangi's father is surprised by the unusual dishes and asks where all the spices came from, and Puspawangi says that it all came from Tun Nila's bag. Tun Nila is happily impressed. The next morning Puspawangi is amazed to see that Tun Nila has shaved his beard, revealing a handsome face. Tun Nila explains to Puspawangi's father the truth behind his search and asks for Puspawangi's hand in marriage.

When Tun Nila returns to the royal palace with Puspawangi, his parents are overjoyed that he has found his bride. However, the king and all of his senior-ranking ministers are enchanted by Puspawangi's beauty and individually plot to get rid of Tun Nila so to have Puspawangi for themselves. The king pretends to fall ill and consults his ministers for advice. His ministers claim to have dreamt that only the mystical bearded civet can cure his illness. They also claim that the civet is afraid of women, so Tun Nila is to search for it alone, leaving Puspawangi at home.

The night of Tun Nila's absence, the King and his ministers visit Puspawangi one by one. Each time Puspawangi is able to trick them, pretending to be in love with each of them when she is stalling for time, urging them to prove their love for her by doing humiliating things. When each new person arrives, the previous one is told to "hide" somewhere in the house. The King is the last to arrive, and while he is there a "ghost" appears at the window. The King and all his ministers are terrified and flee the house, except one who is trapped inside a chest. The ghost then reveals itself to be Tun Nila in disguise, having overheard the whole incident from his hiding place below the house. He praises Puspawangi's loyalty and cleverness in rebuffing the powerful men's advances.

The next day, Tun Nila and Puspawangi bring the chest to the palace, claiming that it contains the bearded civet. The king opens the chest, revealing the last of the minister who'd tried to seduce Puspawangi, and all of the guilty men realise their wrongdoing and ask for forgiveness.

Cast
 P. Ramlee as Tun Nila Utama, aka Raja Muda Pura Cendana
 Saadiah as Puspawangi
 Raden Sudiro as Puspawangi father
 Momo Latif as Puspawangi mother
 Ahmad Nisfu as Sultan Alam Syahbana
 Habsah Buang as Permaisuri Pura Cendana
 Udo Omar as Datuk Bendahara
 Malik Sutan Muda as Datuk Bentara Mangku Bumi
 Nyong Ismail as Datuk Pujangga
 Mustarjo as Datuk Nikah Kahwin
 M. Babjan as Kelopak Salak, Tun Nila Utama's biological father
 Zainon Fiji as Biji Saga, Tun Nila Utama's biological mother
 Shariff Dol as Megat Alang Sengketa (Keturunan Ayam Belanda)
 Osman Botak (Cameo)

Songs
 Joget Pura Chendana
 Wahai Nenek/Cucu-Cucu
 Mari Kita Ke Ladang
 Jangan Adik Angan-angan

See also
 List of P. Ramlee films

References

External links
 

1959 drama films
1950s musical comedy-drama films
1959 films
Malay-language films
Malaysian historical films
1950s historical comedy-drama films
Films directed by P. Ramlee
Malaysian black-and-white films
Singaporean black-and-white films
Films about social class
Films with screenplays by P. Ramlee
Films scored by P. Ramlee
Malay Film Productions films
Malaysian romantic drama films
Malaysian comedy-drama films
Films set in Asia
Films shot in Singapore